Mayo-Dallah is one of two departments in Mayo-Kebbi Ouest, a region of Chad. Its capital is Pala.

Departments of Chad
Mayo-Kebbi Ouest Region